The Toronto Raptors 2006–07 season was the twelfth National Basketball Association (NBA) season for the Toronto Raptors basketball franchise. Following a poor 2005–06 season, General Manager Bryan Colangelo greatly revamped the team roster during the pre-season but continued to build the team around All-Star Chris Bosh. Despite a sluggish start, the 2006–07 season transformed into a watershed year for Toronto. The Raptors captured their first division title, finished third in the Eastern Conference, made the playoffs for the first time in five years, equalled their best ever regular season record (47-35) of the 2000-01 team (a franchise record eventually surpassed by the 2014–15 team that won 49 games and the 2017–18 team that won 59 games), and secured home court advantage for the first time in franchise history. However, the Raptors met the New Jersey Nets in the first round of the playoffs and were defeated four games to two. At the end of the regular season, head coach Sam Mitchell and Colangelo were named NBA Coach of the Year and NBA Executive of the Year respectively. The Raptors also changed their colour scheme which is still in use today.

Pre-season

NBA Draft

Pre-season trades
Before the season, Toronto won the NBA Draft Lottery and were awarded the 1st overall pick in the 2006 NBA draft. To prepare for their draft choice, the Raptors traded Rafael Araújo for Kris Humphries and Robert Whaley, and traded Matt Bonner, Eric Williams and a second round pick for Rasho Nesterovič and cash considerations. The 1st overall pick was used to select Italian Andrea Bargnani, making him the first European drafted number one overall. Maurizio Gherardini was hired as the club's vice-president and assistant general manager, making him the first European elevated to an NBA executive job. Promising small forward Charlie Villanueva was traded for point guard T. J. Ford and cash considerations, while Chris Bosh was rewarded with a three-year extension.

Roster

Regular season
General Manager Bryan Colangelo continued to surround Bosh with complementary players, and signed two-time Euroleague Most Valuable Player Anthony Parker. Spanish international Jorge Garbajosa and former slam dunk champion Fred Jones were also signed from free agency. The Raptors concluded pre-season transactions by re-signing veteran Darrick Martin. With this new lineup, Toronto looked to maintain a team who could both pass and shoot the ball, but was also stronger defensively than the 2005–06 roster. As a showcase of their new roster, on 15 October 2006, the 119 points by Toronto marked the third highest total in a pre-season game in franchise history. The Raptors finished the pre-season with a 7–1 win–loss record, which was the best record in the league and a franchise record.

Push for playoffs
The first half of the season produced mixed results as Toronto struggled towards the .500 mark after a dismal 2–8 start. Bosh's consistent performances however ensured he was named an All-Star starter in the 2007 NBA All-Star Game on 25 January 2007. He received the most votes after LeBron James among all Eastern Conference forwards. A day later, the Raptors hit the .500 mark for the first time since the 2003–04 season after defeating the Boston Celtics at the Air Canada Centre. On 2 February, the Raptors went 24–23, the first time since 2001–02 that they had been over .500 this late in a season. As a result, the Raptors won three NBA Eastern Conference awards for the month of January: Player of the Month (Bosh), Rookie of the Month (Bargnani) and Coach of the Month (Sam Mitchell). On 4 February, the Raptors' 122–110 home win against the Los Angeles Clippers represented a season-high in points for the Raptors. Within the same week, Bosh's career-high 41 points in a win against the Orlando Magic prompted an unheard of event at the Air Canada Centre—chants of "MVP" by the home fans. This chant was repeated in a win against Vince Carter's New Jersey Nets ten days later—to the disbelief of Carter—a game which also saw the team break franchise records for the most home wins and highest home winning percentage entering the All-Star break.

After the break, Colangelo traded Jones for Juan Dixon, a versatile guard. Luke Jackson was also signed to provide depth to Toronto's bench. Following a win against the Charlotte Bobcats on 1 April 2007, Toronto clinched a playoff berth for the first time in five years. They then claimed their first division title when they defeated the Philadelphia 76ers five days later, winning the Atlantic Division crown. Another franchise record was set when Toronto won the next game against the Bulls, this time for most home wins.

The Raptors were eventually seeded third in the Eastern Conference, marking one of the biggest turnarounds in NBA history in terms of league standing and defensive ranking. Throughout the season, they were lauded for playing solid defense and good sharing and moving of the ball. José Calderón, Bargnani, Dixon and Morris Peterson turned in reliable performances from the bench while Ford and Bosh ran the offence with consistent numbers. And in Parker and Garbajosa, the Raptors had two very versatile players who could both defend and attack. Furthermore, in contrast to previous seasons, the Raptors were able to win games despite injuries to key players such as Bosh, Bargnani, Parker, Ford and Garbajosa. Colangelo, Gherardini and Mitchell were also largely credited for transforming Toronto's fortunes.

Standings

Record vs. opponents

Playoffs
As third seed, the Raptors played sixth seed New Jersey Nets in the first round of the 2007 NBA Playoffs. The series drew much media attention as Vince Carter, a former Raptor who left Toronto under acrimonious circumstances two seasons ago, was now back at the ACC as a Net. In the opening game, while Carter was constantly booed by the home crowd and was not an offensive threat, Toronto's inexperience was evident as they too struggled offensively and were down 65–78 going into the fourth quarter. A late rally by Toronto in the fourth quarter was not enough as they eventually lost 91–96. The Raptors won game 2 89–83 at the ACC to tie the series 1–1, as Bosh recorded 25 points and a game-high 13 rebounds. The Nets won games 3 and 4 to lead 3–1, but Toronto forced a game 6 when they narrowly won 98–96 in game 5. In that game, the Raptors set two post-season franchise records: most points going into halftime and biggest lead for a half. The attendance for the game was also a franchise record for a playoff game. In game 6, however, New Jersey won 98–97, sealing the series 4–2 and sending Toronto out of the first round.

In recognition of being the chief architects of Toronto's turnaround season, on 24 April 2007, Mitchell was named 2006–07 NBA Coach of the Year, the first Raptors coach to receive this honour; Colangelo was later named 2006–07 Executive of the Year.

Game log

|- bgcolor="ffcccc"
| 1
| November 1
| @ New Jersey
| 
| Anthony Parker (22)
| Chris Bosh, T. J. Ford, Jorge Garbajosa, Morris Peterson (5)
| T. J. Ford (7)
| Continental Airlines Arena18,646
| 0–1
|- bgcolor="bbffbb"
| 2
| November 3
| Milwaukee
| 
| Chris Bosh (26)
| Chris Bosh (15)
| T. J. Ford (11)
| Air Canada Centre19,832
| 1–1
|- bgcolor="ffcccc"
| 3
| November 5
| San Antonio
| 
| Chris Bosh (19)
| Chris Bosh (17)
| T. J. Ford (5)
| Air Canada Centre18,098
| 1–2
|- bgcolor="bbffbb"
| 4
| November 8
| Philadelphia
| 
| Chris Bosh (29)
| Chris Bosh (44)
| T. J. Ford (7)
| Air Canada Centre15,831
| 2–2
|- bgcolor="ffcccc"
| 5
| November 10
| Atlanta
| 
| Chris Bosh (19)
| Chris Bosh (17)
| T. J. Ford (11)
| Air Canada Centre14,680
| 2-3
|- bgcolor="ffcccc"
| 6
| November 12
| @ Sacramento
| 
| Chris Bosh (19)
| Chris Bosh (7)
| T. J. Ford (7)
| ARCO Arena17,317
| 2–4
|- bgcolor="ffcccc"
| 7
| November 14
| @ Golden State
| 
| Chris Bosh (23)
| Chris Bosh (22)
| T. J. Ford (6)
| Oracle Arena16,182
| 2–5
|- bgcolor="ffcccc"
| 8
| November 17
| @ L.A. Lakers
| 
| Chris Bosh, Morris Peterson (20)
| Chris Bosh (10)
| T. J. Ford, Fred Jones (6)
| Staples Center18,997
| 2–6
|- bgcolor="ffcccc"
| 9
| November 18
| @ Denver
| 
| Chris Bosh (31)
| Jorge Garbajosa (10)
| T. J. Ford (18)
| Pepsi Center15,531
| 2–7
|- bgcolor="ffcccc"
| 10
| November 20
| @ Utah
| 
| Chris Bosh (17)
| Chris Bosh (11)
| T. J. Ford (5)
| EnergySolutions Arena18,881
| 2–8
|- bgcolor="bbffbb"
| 11
| November 22
| Cleveland
| 
| Chris Bosh (25)
| Chris Bosh (14)
| Chris Bosh (6)
| Air Canada Centre19,800
| 3–8
|- bgcolor="ffcccc"
| 12
| November 24
| @ Atlanta
| 
| T. J. Ford (25)
| Jorge Garbajosa (12)
| T. J. Ford (12)
| Philips Arena16,630
| 3–9
|- bgcolor="bbffbb"
| 13
| November 26
| Indiana
| 
| Chris Bosh (17)
| Chris Bosh (11)
| T. J. Ford (6)
| Air Canada Centre18,075
| 4–9
|- bgcolor="bbffbb"
| 14
| November 28
| @ New Orleans/Oklahoma City
| 
| Chris Bosh, Anthony Parker (19)
| Chris Bosh (14)
| José Calderón (4)
| Ford Center15,647
| 5–9
|- bgcolor="ffcccc"
| 15
| November 29
| @ Dallas
| 
| Chris Bosh, T. J. Ford (18)
| Chris Bosh (11)
| José Calderón (4)
| American Airlines Center19,975
| 5–10

|- bgcolor="bbffbb"
| 16
| December 1
| Boston
| 
| Chris Bosh (25)
| Chris Bosh (11)
| T. J. Ford (13)
| Air Canada Centre16,562
| 6–10
|- bgcolor="bbffbb"
| 17
| December 2
| @ New York
| 
| Chris Bosh (26)
| Chris Bosh (13)
| T. J. Ford (10)
| Madison Square Garden17,525
| 7–10
|- bgcolor="ffcccc"
| 18
| December 6
| @ Cleveland
| 
| Chris Bosh, Anthony Parker (18)
| Chris Bosh (12)
| T. J. Ford (10)
| Quicken Loans Arena20,119
| 7–11
|- bgcolor="ffcccc"
| 19
| December 8
| @ Chicago
| 
| Jorge Garbajosa (17)
| Chris Bosh (12)
| José Calderón (8)
| United Center21,797
| 7–12
|- bgcolor="ffcccc"
| 20
| December 10
| Portland
| 
| Morris Peterson (23)
| Jorge Garbajosa (7)
| T. J. Ford (6)
| Air Canada Centre15,542
| 7–13
|- bgcolor="ffcccc"
| 21
| December 11
| @ Miami
| 
| Anthony Parker (18)
| Kris Humphries (7)
| T. J. Ford (12)
| American Airlines Arena19,600
| 7–14
|- bgcolor="bbffbb"
| 22
| December 13
| @ Orlando
| 
| Andrea Bargnani (23)
| Radoslav Nesterović (10)
| T. J. Ford (5)
| Amway Arena15,417
| 8–14
|- bgcolor="bbffbb"
| 23
| December 15
| New Jersey
| 
| T. J. Ford (17)
| T. J. Ford, Joey Graham (9)
| T. J. Ford (8)
| Air Canada Centre19,897
| 9–14
|- bgcolor="bbffbb"
| 24
| December 17
| Golden State
| 
| Morris Peterson (23)
| Jorge Garbajosa (11)
| T. J. Ford (14)
| Air Canada Centre16,035
| 10–14
|- bgcolor="ffcccc"
| 25
| December 19
| @ Phoenix
| 
| T. J. Ford (19)
| P. J. Tucker (9)
| T. J. Ford (9)
| US Airways Center18,422
| 10–15
|- bgcolor="bbffbb"
| 26
| December 20
| @ L.A. Clippers
| 
| Fred Jones (23)
| Andrea Bargnani, Radoslav Nesterović (7)
| T. J. Ford (9)
| Staples Center17,962
| 11–15
|- bgcolor="bbffbb"
| 27
| December 22
| @ Portland
| 
| T. J. Ford (23)
| Anthony Parker (8)
| T. J. Ford (10)
| Rose Garden15,220
| 12–15
|- bgcolor="ffcccc"
| 28
| December 23
| @ Seattle
| 
| T. J. Ford (24)
| Jorge Garbajosa, Radoslav Nesterović (7)
| José Calderón (10)
| KeyArena14,611
| 12–16
|- bgcolor="bbffbb"
| 29
| December 27
| Minnesota
| 
| T. J. Ford (28)
| Jorge Garbajosa (10)
| T. J. Ford (7)
| Air Canada Centre19,800
| 13–16
|- bgcolor="ffcccc"
| 30
| December 29
| Chicago
| 
| T. J. Ford (20)
| Radoslav Nesterović (8)
| Jorge Garbajosa (7)
| Air Canada Centre19,800
| 13–17
|- bgcolor="ffcccc"
| 31
| December 30
| @ Memphis
| 
| Morris Peterson (19)
| Radoslav Nesterović (9)
| Darrick Martin (10)
| FedExForum15,119
| 13–18

|- bgcolor="ffcccc"
| 32
| January 3
| Phoenix
| 
| Chris Bosh (26)
| Chris Bosh (14)
| José Calderón (6)
| Air Canada Centre20,063
| 13–19
|- bgcolor="bbffbb"
| 33
| January 5
| Atlanta
| 
| Chris Bosh (21)
| Radoslav Nesterović (9)
| José Calderón (12)
| Air Canada Centre17,977
| 14–19
|- bgcolor="bbffbb"
| 34
| January 7
| Washington
| 
| Chris Bosh (24)
| Chris Bosh (15)
| Anthony Parker (6)
| Air Canada Centre17,981
| 15–19
|- bgcolor="ffcccc"
| 35
| January 9
| @ New Jersey
| 
| Andrea Bargnani (22)
| Chris Bosh (6)
| José Calderón (12)
| Continental Airlines Arena14,729
| 15–20
|- bgcolor="bbffbb"
| 36
| January 10
| @ Milwaukee
| 
| Chris Bosh (30)
| Chris Bosh (8)
| T. J. Ford (10)
| Bradley Center16,432
| 16–20
|- bgcolor="bbffbb"
| 37
| January 12
| @ Boston
| 
| Chris Bosh (27)
| Chris Bosh, Radoslav Nesterović (8)
| T. J. Ford (6)
| TD Banknorth Garden17,191
| 17–20
|- bgcolor="ffcccc"
| 38
| January 14
| Dallas
| 
| Chris Bosh (24)
| Chris Bosh (15)
| T. J. Ford (8)
| Air Canada Centre19,800
| 17–21
|- bgcolor="bbffbb"
| 39
| January 15
| @ Philadelphia
| 
| Chris Bosh (27)
| Chris Bosh, Anthony Parker (6)
| T. J. Ford (10)
| Wachovia Center12,380
| 18–21
|- bgcolor="bbffbb"
| 40
| January 17
| Sacramento
| 
| Morris Peterson (22)
| Chris Bosh (9)
| José Calderón (9)
| Air Canada Centre15,175
| 19–21
|- bgcolor="ffbbbb"
| 41
| January 19
| Utah
| 
| Chris Bosh (29)
| Chris Bosh (11)
| T. J. Ford, Anthony Parker (6)
| Air Canada Centre17,384
| 19–22
|- bgcolor="bbffbb"
| 42
| January 22
| Charlotte
| 
| Chris Bosh (20)
| Joey Graham (9)
| José Calderón (11)
| Air Canada Centre13,997
| 20–22
|- bgcolor="bbffbb"
| 43
| January 24
| New Orleans/Oklahoma City
| 
| Chris Bosh (35)
| Anthony Parker (9)
| José Calderón (8)
| Air Canada Centre14,173
| 21–22
|- bgcolor="bbffbb"
| 44
| January 26
| Boston
| 
| Chris Bosh (26)
| Chris Bosh, Jorge Garbajosa (8)
| José Calderón (8)
| Air Canada Centre18,565
| 22–22
|- bgcolor="ffcccc"
| 45
| January 27
| @ Indiana
| 
| Chris Bosh (26)
| Chris Bosh (12)
| José Calderón (10)
| Conseco Fieldhouse14,263
| 22–23
|- bgcolor="bbffbb"
| 46
| January 31
| Washington
| 
| Chris Bosh (34)
| Chris Bosh (8)
| José Calderón (11)
| Air Canada Centre16,145
| 23–23

|- bgcolor="bbffbb"
| 47
| February 2
| @ Atlanta
| 
| Chris Bosh (24)
| Chris Bosh (10)
| T. J. Ford (10)
| Philips Arena13,200
| 24–23
|- bgcolor="bbffbb"
| 48
| February 4
| L.A. Clippers
| 
| Chris Bosh (27)
| Chris Bosh (7)
| José Calderón (12)
| Air Canada Centre17,214
| 25–23
|- bgcolor="bbffbb"
| 49
| February 7
| Orlando
| 
| Chris Bosh (41)
| Chris Bosh (8)
| José Calderón, T. J. Ford (11)
| Air Canada Centre15,157
| 26–23
|- bgcolor="bbffbb"
| 50
| February 9
| L.A. Lakers
| 
| Chris Bosh (29)
| Chris Bosh (11)
| T. J. Ford (7)
| Air Canada Centre20,012
| 27–23
|- bgcolor="ffcccc"
| 51
| February 10
| @ Detroit
| 
| T. J. Ford (17)
| Chris Bosh (11)
| T. J. Ford (11)
| The Palace of Auburn Hills22,076
| 27–24
|- bgcolor="bbffbb"
| 52
| February 13
| @ Chicago
| 
| Chris Bosh (25)
| Chris Bosh (14)
| José Calderón (9)
| United Center21,776
| 28–24
|- bgcolor="bbffbb"
| 53
| February 14
| New Jersey
| 
| Chris Bosh (25)
| Chris Bosh (9)
| T. J. Ford (8)
| Air Canada Centre19,800
| 29–24
|- bgcolor="ffcccc"
| 54
| February 21
| Cleveland
| 
| Chris Bosh (24)
| Chris Bosh (10)
| T. J. Ford (9)
| Air Canada Centre19,800
| 29–25
|- bgcolor="bbffbb"
| 55
| February 23
| Indiana
| 
| Chris Bosh (23)
| Chris Bosh (12)
| José Calderón (12)
| Air Canada Centre19,481
| 30–25
|- bgcolor="bbffbb"
| 56
| February 24
| @ Charlotte
| 
| Chris Bosh (24)
| Andrea Bargnani, Chris Bosh (11)
| T. J. Ford (4)
| Charlotte Bobcats Arena17,091
| 31–25
|- bgcolor="ffcccc"
| 57
| February 26
| @ San Antonio
| 
| Andrea Bargnani (17)
| Chris Bosh, Radoslav Nesterović (9)
| José Calderón (8)
| AT&T Center18,563
| 31–26
|- bgcolor="bbffbb"
| 58
| February 28
| @ Houston
| 
| Andrea Bargnani (20)
| Chris Bosh (9)
| Chris Bosh, José Calderón, T. J. Ford (6)
| Toyota Center14,071
| 32–26

|- bgcolor="ffcccc"
| 59
| March 2
| Milwaukee
| 
| Andrea Bargnani (16)
| Chris Bosh (10)
| T. J. Ford (9)
| Air Canada Centre18,816
| 32–27
|- bgcolor="ffcccc"
| 60
| March 3
| @ Cleveland
| 
| Chris Bosh (25)
| T. J. Ford (7)
| T. J. Ford (7)
| Quicken Loans Arena20,562
| 32–28
|- bgcolor="ffcccc"
| 61
| March 6
| @ Washington
| 
| Chris Bosh (25)
| Kris Humphries (5)
| T. J. Ford (6)
| Verizon Center15,529
| 32–29
|- bgcolor="bbffbb"
| 62
|March 7
| Memphis
| 
| Chris Bosh (19)
| Chris Bosh (9)
| José Calderón (9)
| Air Canada Centre16,940
| 33–29
|- bgcolor="bbffbb"
| 63
| March 11
| Seattle
| 
| Chris Bosh (27)
| Chris Bosh (10)
| T. J. Ford (13)
| Air Canada Centre19,800
| 34–29
|- bgcolor="bbffbb"
| 64
| March 12
| @ Milwaukee
| 
| Chris Bosh (25)
| Chris Bosh (10)
| T. J. Ford (9)
| Bradley Center13,411
| 35–29
|- bgcolor="bbffbb"
| 65
| March 14
| New York
| 
| Chris Bosh (22)
| Chris Bosh (8)
| T. J. Ford (18)
| Air Canada Centre19,800
| 36–29
|- bgcolor="ffcccc"
| 66
| March 16
| Houston
| 
| T. J. Ford (18)
| Chris Bosh (19)
| T. J. Ford (8)
| Air Canada Centre20,102
| 36–30
|- bgcolor="ffcccc"
| 67
| March 18
| @ New York
| 
| Chris Bosh (21)
| Kris Humphries (9)
| T. J. Ford (3)
| Madison Square Garden19,763
| 36–31
|- bgcolor="bbffbb"
| 68
| March 21
| Orlando
| 
| Chris Bosh (34)
| Chris Bosh (16)
| T. J. Ford (12)
| Air Canada Centre18,326
| 37–31
|- bgcolor="bbffbb"
| 69
| March 23
| Denver
| 
| Morris Peterson (23)
| Jorge Garbajosa (9)
| T. J. Ford (14)
| Air Canada Centre20,120
| 38–31
|- bgcolor="ffcccc"
| 70
| March 26
| @ Boston
| 
| T. J. Ford (28)
| Chris Bosh (11)
| T. J. Ford (9)
| TD Banknorth Garden14,708
| 38–32
|- bgcolor="bbffbb"
| 71
| March 28
| Miami
| 
| Anthony Parker (20)
| Chris Bosh (18)
| T. J. Ford (9)
| Air Canada Centre19,800
| 39–32
|- bgcolor="bbffbb"
| 72
| March 30
| @ Washington
| 
| Chris Bosh (37)
| Chris Bosh (14)
| José Calderón (8)
| Verizon Center20,173
| 40–32

|- bgcolor="bbffbb"
| 73
| April 1
| Charlotte
| 
| Chris Bosh (24)
| Chris Bosh (16)
| T. J. Ford (8)
| Air Canada Centre19,023
| 41–32
|- bgcolor="ffcccc"
| 74
| April 3
| @ Miami
| 
| Chris Bosh (24)
| Chris Bosh (11)
| T. J. Ford (7)
| American Airlines Arena19,600
| 41–33
|- bgcolor="bbffbb"
| 75
| April 4
| @ Orlando
| 
| Chris Bosh (28)
| Chris Bosh (10)
| T. J. Ford (8)
| Amway Arena16,911
| 42–33
|- bgcolor="bbffbb"
| 76
| April 6
| @ Philadelphia
| 
| Chris Bosh (23)
| Chris Bosh (13)
| José Calderón, T. J. Ford (6)
| Wachovia Center17,566
| 43–33
|- bgcolor="bbffbb"
| 77
| April 8
| Chicago
| 
| Anthony Parker (27)
| Chris Bosh (11)
| José Calderón (8)
| Air Canada Centre19,800
| 44–33
|- bgcolor="bbffbb"
| 78
| April 9
| @ Minnesota
| 
| Anthony Parker (24)
| Chris Bosh (13)
| T. J. Ford (10)
| Target Center15,561
| 45–33
|- bgcolor="bbffbb"
| 79
| April 13
| Detroit
| 
| Anthony Parker (21)
| Kris Humphries (18)
| T. J. Ford (10)
| Air Canada Centre19,800
| 46–33
|- bgcolor="bbffbb"
| 80
| April 15
| New York
| 
| Chris Bosh (23)
| Chris Bosh (8)
| Chris Bosh (7)
| Air Canada Centre19,800
| 47–33
|- bgcolor="ffcccc"
| 81
| April 17
| @ Detroit
| 
| Uroš Slokar (18)
| Morris Peterson (13)
| Darrick Martin (8)
| The Palace of Auburn Hills22,076
| 47–34
|- bgcolor="ffcccc"
| 82
| April 18
| Philadelphia
| 
| Luke Jackson (30)
| Chris Bosh (9)
| T. J. Ford (10)
| Air Canada Centre19,800
| 47–35

Playoffs

|- bgcolor="ffcccc"
| 1
| April 21
| New Jersey
| 
| Chris Bosh (22)
| Rasho Nesterovič (10)
| José Calderón (8)
| Air Canada Centre20,330
| 0–1
|- bgcolor="bbffbb"
| 2
| April 24
| New Jersey
| 
| Anthony Parker (26)
| Chris Bosh (13)
| T. J. Ford (6)
| Air Canada Centre20,239
| 1–1
|- bgcolor="ffcccc"
| 3
| April 27
| @ New Jersey
| 
| T. J. Ford (27)
| Chris Bosh (11)
| T. J. Ford (8)
| Continental Airlines Arena17,147
| 1–2
|- bgcolor="ffcccc"
| 4
| April 29
| @ New Jersey
| 
| Andrea Bargnani (16)
| Chris Bosh (10)
| T. J. Ford (5)
| Continental Airlines Arena20,032
| 1–3
|- bgcolor="bbffbb"
| 5
| May 1
| New Jersey
| 
| José Calderón (25)
| Joey Graham (10)
| José Calderón (8)
| Air Canada Centre20,511
| 2–3
|- bgcolor="ffcccc"
| 6
| May 4
| @ New Jersey
| 
| Chris Bosh (23)
| Morris Peterson (8)
| Chris Bosh (9)
| Continental Airlines Arena 17,242
| 2–4

Player statistics

Regular season

|-
| 
| 65 || 1 || 25.1 || .427 || .373 || .824 || 3.9 || .8 || .5 || .8 || 11.6
|-
| 
| 69 || 69 || style=";"| 38.5 || .496 || .343 || .785 || style=";"| 10.7 || 2.5 || .6 || style=";"| 1.3 || style=";"| 22.6
|-
| 
| 77 || 11 || 21.0 || .521 || .333 || .818 || 1.7 || 5.0 || .8 || .1 || 8.7
|-
| 
| 26 || 5 || 26.3 || .425 || .325 || style=";"| .932 || 2.8 || 1.6 || 1.0 || .1 || 11.1
|-
| 
| 75 || 71 || 29.9 || .436 || .304 || .819 || 3.1 || style=";"| 7.9 || style=";"| 1.3 || .1 || 14.0
|-
| 
| 67 || 60 || 28.5 || .420 || .342 || .731 || 4.9 || 1.9 || 1.2 || .2 || 8.5
|-
| 
| 79 || 21 || 16.7 || .495 || .290 || .840 || 3.1 || .6 || .4 || .1 || 6.4
|-
| 
| 60 || 2 || 11.2 || .470 || . || .671 || 3.1 || .3 || .2 || .4 || 3.8
|-
| 
| 10 || 2 || 12.2 || .514 || .308 || .556 || .9 || .9 || .5 || .1 || 4.5
|-
| 
| 39 || 9 || 22.3 || .386 || .317 || .830 || 2.1 || 1.4 || .8 || .3 || 7.6
|-
| 
| 31 || 0 || 7.1 || .351 || .351 || .714 || .4 || 1.4 || .1 || .0 || 3.0
|-
| 
| style=";"| 80 || style=";"| 73 || 21.0 || style=";"| .546 || .000 || .680 || 4.5 || .9 || .5 || 1.1 || 6.2
|-
| 
| 73 || style=";"| 73 || 33.4 || .477 || .441 || .835 || 3.9 || 2.1 || 1.0 || .2 || 12.4
|-
| 
| 71 || 12 || 21.3 || .429 || .359 || .683 || 3.3 || .7 || .6 || .2 || 8.9
|-
| 
| 20 || 0 || 3.6 || .538 || style=";"| .500 || .692 || .7 || .1 || .1 || .1 || 1.9
|-
| 
| 7 || 0 || 4.9 || .333 || . || .667 || 1.6 || .3 || .1 || .1 || 1.4
|-
| 
| 17 || 0 || 4.9 || .500 || . || .571 || 1.4 || .2 || .1 || .0 || 1.8
|}

Playoffs 

|-
| 
| 6 || 3 || 30.2 || .478 || .412 || .789 || 4.0 || 1.0 || .8 || .5 || 11.0
|-
| 
| style=";"| 6 || style=";"| 6 || 37.0 || .396 || .200 || .842 || style=";"| 9.0 || 2.5 || .8 || style=";"| 1.8 || style=";"| 17.5
|-
| 
| style=";"| 6 || 1 || 24.3 || .507 || .250 || .833 || 1.7 || style=";"| 5.3 || .8 || .0 || 13.0
|-
| 
| style=";"| 6 || 0 || 10.5 || .381 || .250 || . || .7 || .5 || 1.2 || .0 || 3.0
|-
| 
| style=";"| 6 || 5 || 22.7 || .487 || style=";"| .500 || .810 || 1.7 || 4.0 || 1.2 || .3 || 16.0
|-
| 
| style=";"| 6 || 3 || 18.1 || .286 || .000 || .800 || 3.3 || .3 || .7 || .0 || 2.7
|-
| 
| style=";"| 6 || 0 || 11.5 || .333 || . || .375 || 2.8 || .2 || .2 || .3 || 1.5
|-
| 
| 3 || 0 || 3.7 || . || . || style=";"| 1.000 || 1.7 || .3 || .3 || .0 || 2.0
|-
| 
| 2 || 0 || 4.0 || .000 || .000 || style=";"| 1.000 || .5 || 1.0 || .0 || .0 || 1.0
|-
| 
| 5 || 4 || 14.2 || .467 || . || style=";"| 1.000 || 4.6 || .6 || .0 || .4 || 3.4
|-
| 
| style=";"| 6 || style=";"| 6 || style=";"| 40.0 || .419 || .400 || .795 || 5.3 || 1.0 || style=";"| 1.5 || .3 || 15.2
|-
| 
| style=";"| 6 || 2 || 30.5 || style=";"| .517 || style=";"| .500 || .833 || 4.5 || .3 || .3 || .3 || 6.8
|}

References

External links
 2006–07 Toronto Raptors season at Basketball Reference
 2006–07 Toronto Raptors season at Database Basketball
 Official Raptors home page

Toronto Raptors seasons
Toronto
Toronto Raptors
Toronto Raptors
Tor